Kill Team may refer to:

People
 A group of U.S. Army soldiers that perpetrated the Maywand District murders from June 2009–June 2010, during the War in Afghanistan

Media
 "Kill team (demo)", a song by thrash metal band Sadus from the 2007 reissue of Illusions
 The Kill Team (2013 film), a documentary about the Maywand District murders
 The Kill Team (2019 film), a docudrama based on the Maywand District murders

Gaming
 Kill Team, a miniature wargame that is based on Warhammer 40,000 but with smaller, more detailed battles.
 Warhammer 40,000: Kill Team, a 2011 top-down shooter computer game
 Warhammer 40,000: Kill Team, a 2016 expansion with rules for skirmish-level combat for the 7th edition of the Warhammer 40,000 tabletop wargame